The Scroll of the Great Baptism is a Mandaean religious text. It is a ritual scroll describing the 360 baptisms (masbutas) for a polluted priest. The scroll is also called "Fifty Baptisms" and the Raza Rba ḏ-Zihrun.

Manuscripts
Manuscript 50 of the Drower Collection (abbreviated DC 50) is a copy of the Scroll of the Great Baptism. It was copied in 1867 Yahya Bihram and has 962 lines. Güterbock (2008) contains an analysis of the manuscript.

See also
Scroll of the Parwanaya

References

Mandaean texts
Baptism